Jeremy Philip Northam (born 1 December 1961) is an English actor and singer. After a number of television roles, he earned attention as Mr. Knightley in the 1996 film adaptation of Jane Austen's Emma. He has appeared in the films An Ideal Husband, Gosford Park, Amistad, The Winslow Boy, Enigma, Cypher, Dean Spanley, and Martin and Lewis, amongst others. He also played Thomas More in the Showtime series The Tudors. From 2016 to 2017 he appeared as Anthony Eden in the Netflix series The Crown.

Early life and education
Northam was born in Cambridge, Cambridgeshire, the youngest of four children. His mother, Rachel (née Howard), was a potter and professor of economics, and his father, John Northam, was a professor of literature and theatre, as well as being an Ibsen specialist and lecturer (first at Clare College, Cambridge and later at Bristol). He has described his upbringing as not wealthy, but warm.

Northam was educated at King's College School, Cambridge, Bristol Grammar School and Bedford College, London (B.A. English, 1984) now part of Royal Holloway, University of London, and trained at the Bristol Old Vic Theatre School.

Career

Screen and stage
Northam performed at the Royal National Theatre – he replaced both Ian Charleson and Daniel Day-Lewis in the role of Hamlet (1989) when they had to withdraw and won the Olivier Award in 1990 for "most promising newcomer" for his performance in The Voysey Inheritance.

He has appeared frequently in British films such as Carrington (1995), Emma (1996), The Winslow Boy (1999), An Ideal Husband (1999), Enigma (2001) and as Welsh actor and singer Ivor Novello in Gosford Park (2001). He made his American film debut in The Net (1995).

In 2002 he starred in the film Cypher.
That same year, he portrayed singer Dean Martin in the CBS film Martin and Lewis and golfer Walter Hagen in Bobby Jones: Stroke of Genius in 2004.
In 2007 and 2008, he portrayed Thomas More on the Showtime series, The Tudors. He played John Brodie Innes in the 2009 film Creation, based on the life of Charles Darwin. In the 2015 film The Man Who Knew Infinity, he portrayed the philosopher Bertrand Russell. He played British Prime Minister Anthony Eden in the 2016 Netflix drama series The Crown.

Other work
His audiobook work includes The Silver Chair by C. S. Lewis for Harper Audio and A Death Divided by Clare Francis for Macmillan. For SilkSoundBooks, he recorded The Real Thing and Other Short Stories and The Aspern Papers, both written by Henry James. In 2007 he recorded Gerard Manley Hopkins poems for "The Great Poets" edition for Naxos Audiobooks.  In 2009, he recorded Our Man in Havana by Graham Greene for CSA Word.  He recorded the audio book Dark Matter, a ghost story by Michelle Paver, in September 2010; it was released on 21 October 2010, by Orion.

In the Gosford Park soundtrack, Northam sings the Ivor Novello songs "And Her Mother Came Too", "What a Duke Should Be", "Why Isn't It You", "I Can Give You the Starlight" and "The Land of Might Have Been" accompanied by his brother Christopher on piano.

Filmography

Theatre
 Edward Voysey, The Voysey Inheritance, National Theatre Company, Cottesloe Theatre, London, 1989
 Also appeared in productions of School for Scandal and The Shaughraun, National Theatre Company.
 Osric, then later title role, Hamlet, National Theatre Company, Olivier Theatre, London, 1989
 The Three Sisters, 1991
 The Way of the World, 1992
 Philip, The Gift of the Gorgon, Royal Shakespeare Company, The Pit (theatre), London, 1992
 Elomire, La Bête, Really Useful Theatre Company, 1993
 Berowne, Love's Labour's Lost, Royal Shakespeare Company, Barbican Theatre, London, 1994
 Mr. Horner, The Country Wife, Royal Shakespeare Company, Pit Theatre, 1994
 Obstetrician, Certain Young Men, Almeida Theatre, London, 1999
 Old Times, Donmar Warehouse Theatre, London, 2004
 Richard Greatham, Hay Fever, Noël Coward Theatre, London, 2012

Personal life
Northam married Canadian film/television make-up artist Liz Moro in April 2005, though they later divorced.

He has said he wished he took life less seriously.

References

External links
 
 

1961 births
Living people
People from Cambridge
Male actors from Cambridgeshire
English male film actors
English male stage actors
English male television actors
Royal Shakespeare Company members
English male Shakespearean actors
Audiobook narrators
Alumni of Bristol Old Vic Theatre School
Alumni of Bedford College, London
People educated at Bristol Grammar School
Laurence Olivier Award winners
Outstanding Performance by a Cast in a Motion Picture Screen Actors Guild Award winners
20th-century English male actors
21st-century English male actors